Kalaus may refer to:

 Dora Kalaus, Croatian handball player
 Larissa Kalaus, Croatian handball player
 Valter Kalaus, Hungarian swimmer
 Kalaus (river), a river in Stavropol Krai, Russia

Croatian surnames